Saadat Bolaghi (also Romanized as Sa‘ādat Bolāghī; also known as Sāveh Bolāghī) is a village in Arshaq-e Markazi Rural District, Arshaq District, Meshgin Shahr County, Ardabil Province, Iran. At the 2006 census, its population was 21, in 6 families.

References 

Towns and villages in Meshgin Shahr County